Daniel Horton may refer to:

 Daniel Horton (basketball) (born 1984), professional basketball player
 Daniel Horton (triple jumper) (1879–?), American track and field athlete